Bernhardt House, also known as the Paul Mathias Bernhardt House, is a historic home located at Salisbury, Rowan County, North Carolina.  It was built in 1882 and remodeled in 1902, and is a two-story, center-hall/double-pile plan, Italian Villa-style frame dwelling. It features arch-headed windows with heavy projecting hoods, an "L"-shaped porch, and bracketed eaves and gables.  A rear addition was built in 1948 and the house was converted to four rental apartments.  Its builder Paul Mathias Bernhardt (1846–1922) was a son of George Matthias Bernhardt (1820–1885), who built the George Matthias Bernhardt House near Rockwell, North Carolina.

It was listed on the National Register of Historic Places in 1992.

References

Houses on the National Register of Historic Places in North Carolina
Italianate architecture in North Carolina
Houses completed in 1882
Houses in Salisbury, North Carolina
National Register of Historic Places in Rowan County, North Carolina